Kamala Harris is the 49th vice president of the United States. Harris was formerly the junior United States senator from California, and prior to her election to the Senate, she served as the 32nd attorney general of California. Her family includes several members who are notable in politics and academia.

Harris's maternal ancestry comes from Tamil Nadu, India and her father is from Saint Ann, Jamaica. She is married to American lawyer Douglas Emhoff.

Immediate family

Douglas Emhoff 

Douglas Emhoff is the husband of Kamala Harris. He was born to Jewish parents, Michael and Barbara Emhoff, in Brooklyn, New York. He lived in New Jersey from 1969 to 1981, moving with his family to California when he was 17. Emhoff graduated from the California State University, Northridge and USC Gould School of Law. Emhoff is an entertainment litigator and began his career at Pillsbury Winthrop's litigation group. He later moved to Belin Rawlings & Badal, a boutique firm, in the late 1990s. He opened his own firm with Ben Whitwell in 2000. The firm was acquired by Venable in 2006. Emhoff is now employed by DLA Piper, working at its Washington, D.C., and California offices. Emhoff was married for 16 years to film producer Kerstin Emhoff née Mackin. They have two children. He married Harris on August 22, 2014, in Santa Barbara, California, with Harris's sister Maya Harris officiating.

Cole Emhoff 

Cole MacKin Emhoff is the stepson of Kamala Harris through her marriage to Doug Emhoff. He was born September 15, 1994, to Kerstin Emhoff and is named after jazz musician John Coltrane. Emhoff graduated from Colorado College with a bachelor's degree in psychology. Emhoff was an assistant at William Morris Endeavor before becoming an executive assistant at Plan B Entertainment. Emhoff calls Harris "Momala".

Ella Emhoff 

Ella Emhoff is the stepdaughter of Kamala Harris through her marriage to Doug Emhoff. She was born May 29, 1999, to Kerstin Emhoff and is named after jazz singer Ella Fitzgerald. In 2014, she was in the music video for Bo Burnham's song "Repeat Stuff". In 2018, Emhoff graduated from high school in Los Angeles where she was on the swim team. She is an artist majoring in apparel and textiles at Parsons School of Design. Emhoff calls Harris "Momala". She designed her inauguration day dress with designer Batsheva Hay.

Immediate family tree

Parents

Shyamala Gopalan 

Shyamala Gopalan was the mother of Kamala Harris. She was an Indian biologist and civil rights activist from Chennai, India. Shyamala was born on April 7, 1938, to P. V. Gopalan and his wife, Rajam. Gopalan's family belongs to the Brahmin caste. Gopalan was from Thulasenthirapuram and Rajam was from Painganaduagrarian villages located very close to each other, near Mannargudi, in the erstwhile Tanjore District. A gifted singer of South Indian classical music, she won a national competition in it as a teenager. She studied Home Science at Lady Irwin College in New Delhi, a leading college in India. In 1958, aged 19, Shyamala unexpectedly applied for a masters program at the University of California, Berkeley; her parents used some of their retirement savings to pay for her tuition and board during the first year. Her family in India, not having phone lines, communicated with her by writing aerogrammes; she eventually earned a PhD in nutrition and endocrinology at UC Berkeley in 1964.

After the October 1964 birth of Kamala and January 1967 birth of Maya, Shyamala became a permanent resident of the United States in April 1968.

Shyamala's work in isolating and characterizing the progesterone receptor gene stimulated advances in breast biology and cancer. She conducted research in UC Berkeley's Department of Zoology and Cancer Research Lab. She worked as a breast cancer researcher at University of Illinois and University of Wisconsin. She worked for 16 years at Lady Davis Institute for Medical Research and McGill University Faculty of Medicine. She served as a peer reviewer for the National Institutes of Health and as a site visit team member for the Federal Advisory Committee. She also served on the President's Special Commission on Breast Cancer. She mentored dozens of students in her lab. Shyamala worked in the Lawrence Berkeley National Laboratory for her last decade of research.

Donald J. Harris 

Donald J. Harris is the father of Kamala Harris. He is a Jamaican-American economist and professor emeritus at Stanford University, originally from Saint Ann's Bay, Jamaica. Of Afro-Jamaican heritage, Harris was born on August 23, 1938, to Beryl Christie Harris (née Finegan) and Oscar Joseph Harris. He grew up in the Orange Hill area of Saint Ann Parish, near Brown's Town. Harris received a Bachelor of Arts from the University College of the West Indies in 1960. In 1963 he came to the United States to earn a PhD from University of California, Berkeley which he completed in 1966. He met his future wife, Shyamala Gopalan through the civil rights movement. Harris was an assistant professor at the University of Illinois at Urbana–Champaign from 1966 to 1967 and at Northwestern University from 1967 to 1968. He moved to the University of Wisconsin–Madison as an associate professor in 1968. In 1972, he joined the faculty of Stanford University as a professor of economics. He directed the Consortium Graduate School of Social Sciences at the University of the West Indies in 1986–1987. He was a Fulbright Scholar in Brazil in 1990 and 1991 and in Mexico in 1992. In 1998, he retired from Stanford becoming a professor emeritus.

Other relatives

Maya Harris 

Maya Harris is the younger sister of Kamala Harris. She was born in Champaign-Urbana, Illinois and raised in the San Francisco Bay Area and Montreal. She had her only child Meena Harris at the age of 17. Harris completed a Bachelor of Arts at University of California, Berkeley and earned a J.D. degree from Stanford Law School. She works as a lawyer, public policy advocate, and a television commentator. Harris married lawyer Tony West in July 1998.

Meena Harris 

Meena Harris is the niece of Kamala Harris. She was born in Oakland, California in 1984. Harris completed a bachelor's degree from Stanford University and a J.D. at Harvard Law School. She is a lawyer and children's book author. She founded a campaign to raise awareness on social policy issues. Her 2020 children's book is based on the life story of her mother and aunt. Harris and her husband Nikolas Ajagu have two daughters.

P. V. Gopalan 

P. V. Gopalan (1911 – February 1998) was the maternal grandfather of Kamala Harris. Gopalan was a career civil servant, eventually serving as Joint Secretary to Government of India in the Ministry of Labour, Employment and Rehabilitation. He was later deputed to the Government of Zambia and lived in Lusaka as Director of Relief Measures and Refugees, to help Zambia manage an influx of refugees from Southern Rhodesia (now Zimbabwe). Gopalan and his wife Rajam were from Tamil Nadu state and had wed in an arranged marriage. They had four children. Their eldest daughter Shyamala became a scientist in the United States and Canada. Their son Balachandran received a PhD in economics and computer science from the University of Wisconsin–Madison and returned to an academic career in India. Their daughter Sarala is an obstetrician who practiced in the coastal city of Chennai, India. Their youngest daughter Mahalakshmi is an information scientist, who worked for the Government of Ontario.

Sharada Balachandran 
Sharada Balachandran Orihuela is the first cousin of Kamala Harris. She is an Indian Mexican born in Mexico to Rosamaria Orihuela and Gopalan Balachandran. She started formal education in New Delhi and moved frequently between India, Mexico, and the United States. After moving to Oakland, California for college in 2001, Balachandran Orihuela's aunt, Shyamala Gopalan, helped her cope with race relations in the aftermath of the September 11 attacks and later influenced her intellectual trajectory. Balachandran Orihuela graduated from Mills College and University of California, Davis. She is an associate professor of English and comparative literature at University of Maryland, College Park. She authored the 2018 book, Fugitives, Smugglers, and Thieves.

Ancestry of Kamala Harris 
Kamala Harris is of Black Jamaican descent on her paternal side and of Indian descent on her maternal side. According to the Los Angeles Times, "Gopalan (Kamala's mother) was a Tamil Brahmin, part of a "privileged elite" in Hinduism's ancient caste hierarchy." Donald J. Harris wrote in an account of his family ancestry that the Harris name comes from his paternal grandfather Joseph Alexander Harris, a land owner and agricultural produce exporter, and that his paternal grandmother "Miss Chrishy" (née Christiana Brown) was a descendant of Hamilton Brown, a plantation and slave owner. However, Snopes rated this claim as unproven pending further research. Snopes noted that Harris made errors in some of the vital dates he provided for births and deaths of his grandparents.

See also 
Family of Joe Biden, Harris's  president (2021–present)
Family of Barack Obama
List of African American firsts
List of African American U.S. state firsts
List of Asian-American firsts
List of American women's firsts
List of women's firsts

References 

Harris family
Harris
Kamala Harris
Harris
Harris
Harris
Harris
Harris
Harris